Rosário do Catete is a municipality located in the Brazilian state of Sergipe. Its population was 11,008 (2020) and its area is 105 km².

References

Municipalities in Sergipe